Calvert Worthington (29 August 1830 – 17 November 1871) was an English cricketer. He was the son of William Worthington (1799–1871), of the brewing family, and his wife Mary Anne Calvert. Worthington played two first-class matches for Otago between 1864 and 1866.

See also
 List of Otago representative cricketers

References

External links
 

1830 births
1871 deaths
English cricketers
Otago cricketers
Sportspeople from Burton upon Trent